Parliamentary Debates (Hansard) is the official name of the transcripts of debates in the New Zealand Parliament. New Zealand was one of the first countries to establish an independent team of Hansard reporters, 42 years before the British (Imperial) Parliament. An official record of debates has been kept continuously since 9 July 1867. Speeches made in the House of Representatives and the Legislative Council between 1867 and the commencement of Parliament in 1854 were compiled in 1885 from earlier newspaper reports, and this compilation also forms part of the New Zealand Hansard record.

The Hansard takes its name from Thomas Curson Hansard, who started publishing a daily record of proceedings in the British Parliament in the early 19th century.

History

For 13 years from the establishment of the New Zealand Parliament in Auckland in 1854 newspaper reports were the only record of what MPs said in debates in the Legislative Council and the House of Representatives. The accuracy of these reports often depended on the political leanings of the owners of the newspaper in which they were published, and consistency of reporting was a real problem, as noted in an article in the Wellington Independent newspaper in 1860:
“These reports give you little notion of the reality. Some members … whose speeches are dreary beyond belief, and almost unintelligible as delivered in the House, [become] flowing oratory in the columns of the newspaper.  While others… are shorn of their fair proportions, and their speeches reduced to mere notes… Members who usually talk to empty benches [appear] as prominent as those who electrify the gallery or are the life of the House.”

MP William Fitzherbert brought a motion to the House in 1856 calling for funds to be applied to "secure accurate and authentic reports of the substance and arguments of the speeches". Then in 1862 James FitzGerald (MP for Christchurch and owner of The Press) introduced a motion calling on the Government to take steps to secure the publication of "full and accurate reports of the debates in this House".  Despite both motions being unanimously agreed, it was not until 1866 that a Select Committee, chaired by FitzGerald, was established to “consider and report as to the best manner in which the debates of the General Assembly can be reported and printed.”

On 9 July 1867 a team of five reporters (AJ Dallas, George McIntyre, James Kinsella, ET Gillon, and William Mitchell who later drowned), led by Chief Reporter C.C.N. Barron, produced the first official report of debates of the New Zealand Parliament. One notable Hansard Reporter from the 1870s and 1880s was George Fisher, who was mayor of Wellington for four terms, member of Parliament for Wellington and Minister of Education and Commissioner of Trade and Customs. Another notable early Hansard Reporter was Charles Melville Crombie, who later became Chief Commissioner of Taxes.

Reporters worked in 15 minute "turns" and had to cover speeches in both debating chambers, regularly working until after midnight to finish the day's reports, taking notes using Pitman shorthand and then transcribing these by dictation. From the establishment of the Hansard team speeches were reported as fully as possible, although for many years it was regularly proposed that only summaries of speeches should be published. Reporters had to cope with speakers who had a variety of different accents and speaking pace, and had to learn the names of an increasing number of members, with the number of members in the House alone increasing from 37 in 1854 to 95 by 1882. Competent reporters with shorthand skills were scarce in New Zealand and men were brought in during parliamentary sessions from Australian parliaments to assist local reporters.

In 1884 Maurice FitzGerald, son of James FitzGerald, was engaged to compile from newspaper reports speeches made in Parliament between 1854 and 1867. Maurice Fitzgerald completed this work in 1885. He died in 1886 (at 25 years of age) from tuberculosis before all five volumes of his compilation were printed.

New Zealand Hansard today
Official transcripts of MPs' speeches in the House have been continuously published since 1867. Today Hansard is produced by a team of about 17 FTE Hansard editors within the Office of the Clerk of the House of Representatives. Hansard is published on the New Zealand Parliament website each day the House sits, and later indexed bound volumes are produced.

Speeches are transcribed directly from digital recordings of the debate, with staff present in the debating chamber to monitor the debate by recording the sequence of speakers and any interjections. Interjections are reported only if the member speaking replies to them or remarks on them during the course of his or her speech. Hansard Editors follow strict rules on what changes they can make to the words MPs use in the debating chamber. Hansard is as close to verbatim as possible, although Hansard Editors remove repetitions and redundancies and make minor grammatical corrections. MPs are provided draft copies of their speeches at the same time that the speeches are first published on the Parliament website. MPs can request correction of inadvertent factual inaccuracies but they are unable to significantly change what they said in the House.

Timeline of establishment of Hansard in New Zealand

Volumes
Hansard has been digitized by Google in partnership with the University of California (Santa Cruz et al. libraries), from the first sitting of the House in May 1854 up to July 1987. These digital volumes are hosted by HathiTrust and are available via the links in the first column of the table below. The entire collection up to July 1987 is searchable using the HathiTrust website. The last column of the table below has links to other digital volumes created in partnership with university libraries if these are publicly available via HathiTrust.

Hansard from 16 September 1987 to 17 December 2002 created from word processing files (i.e., not the official printed volumes) is available via the links in the first column of the table below and the 123 volumes in this period can be downloaded here (this is useful for searching across the collection).

Hansard from 11 February 2003 onwards is available from the NZ Parliament website. The period 11 February 2003 to 9 June 2016 is also available via the links in the first column of the table below and the 109 volumes in this period can be downloaded here.

References

External links
 Official Hansard records available on the New Zealand Parliament website
 Searchable collection on the HathiTrust website

Transcripts of legislative proceedings
Hansard